This is a list of some notable people who attended Harvard University, but did not graduate or have yet to graduate. See List of Harvard University people for a more comprehensive list of people affiliated with Harvard.

References 

Non-graduate alumni
Lists of people by university or college in Massachusetts